Emimol Mohan, (born 29 April 1988) better known by her stage name Varada is an Indian actress who works predominantly in Malayalam films and television. After making her acting debut in the 2006 Malayalam film Vaasthavam, she played the lead role in the 2008 film  Sultan. Her breakthrough role was with the Malayalam soap opera Amala aired from 2013 to 2015.

Early life 
Varada was born as Emimol Mohan on 29 April 1988 in Ahmedabad, Gujarat to Mohan Abraham and Pushpa Mohan. She has a younger brother, Eric Mohan. She was brought up and educated in Thrissur. After her primary education from Sacred Heart Convent Girls Higher Secondary School in Thrissur in 2004, Varada joined the St. Joseph's English Medium Higher Secondary School in Eravu for higher secondary education. She completed graduation in Bachelor of Arts in Economics from University of Calicut.

Career
While studying in plus two (higher secondary), she modeled for a calendar and soon advertisements followed. Then, she anchored for a local television channel in her hometown Thrissur, followed by programs in Jeevan TV and Kairali TV. She made her acting debut in the film Vaasthavam in 2006. She played the female lead in Sultan in 2008. It was from Sultan that she took the stage name Varada, as per the suggestion of writer-director A. K. Lohithadas who was a mentor of the film's director. She made her television debut with Snehakoodu on Surya TV. Varada got a breakthrough with the title role in the serial Amala on Mazhavil Manorama. Then she appeared as heroine in the serial Pranayam on Asianet, which was a remake of the Hindi soap opera Yeh Hai Mohabbatein. She left the show after pregnancy. She made her come back in serial through Ilayaval Gayathri.

Personal life
On 25 May 2014, Varada married her Amala co-star Jishin Mohan. The couple have a son.

Filmography

Films
 All films are in Malayalam unless noted otherwise.

Television 

 All shows are in Malayalam.

Guest appearances

Webseries

Awards and Nominations

Notes

References

External links
 
 

Living people
Indian film actresses
Actresses from Thrissur
Actresses in Malayalam cinema
Actresses in Malayalam television
Indian television actresses
21st-century Indian actresses
Actresses in Tamil cinema
1988 births